In computer science, particularly in functional programming, hash consing is a technique used to share values that are structurally equal. The term hash consing originates from implementations of Lisp that attempt to reuse cons cells that have been constructed before, avoiding the penalty of memory allocation. Hash consing is most commonly implemented with hash tables storing weak references that may be garbage-collected when the data stored therein contains no references from outside the table. Hash consing has been shown to give dramatic performance improvements—both space and time—for symbolic and dynamic programming algorithms. An interesting property of hash consing is that two structures can be tested for equality in constant time, which in turn can improve efficiency of divide and conquer algorithms when data sets contain overlapping blocks.

Example

Simple, not very efficient, but suitable for demonstration of the concept implementation of a memoizer by means of hash table and weak references in Scheme:

;; weak hashes
;;
(require 'hash-table)

(define (make-weak-table . args)
  (apply make-hash-table args))

(define (weak-table-set! table key data)
  (let ((w (hash-table-ref table key #f)))
    (if w
        (vector-set! w 0 data)
      (let ((w (make-weak-vector 1)))
        (vector-set! w 0 data)
        (hash-table-set! table key w)))))

(define (weak-table-ref table key)
  (let ((w (hash-table-ref table key #f)))
    (if w
        (vector-ref w 0)
      #f)))

;; memoizer factory: for given (side-effect-free) procedure,
;; return a procedure which does the same memoizing some of results
;; in the sense of equal? on the whole list of args
;;
(define (make-weak-memoizer proc)
  (let ((cache (make-weak-table equal?)))
    (lambda args
      (let ((x (weak-table-ref cache args)))
        (if (bwp-object? x)
            (let ((r (apply proc args)))
              (weak-table-set! cache args r)
              r)
          x)))))

See also
String interning
Flyweight pattern
 Merkle tree
 Hashlife
 Interning

References

Further reading
 
 Jean Goubault. Implementing Functional Languages with Fast Equality, Sets and Maps: an Exercise in Hash Consing. In Journées Francophones des Langages Applicatifs (JFLA’93), pages 222–238, Annecy, February 1993.

Implementation of functional programming languages
Hashing
Articles with example Scheme (programming language) code